The Geneva Open Challenger, also known as IPP Trophy was a tennis tournament held in Geneva, Switzerland from 1988 to 2014. The event is part of the ATP Challenger Tour. Previously played on outdoor clay courts, it has been played indoors on hard GreenSet courts since 2011, at Sport Center of the Queue d'Arve. Originally, it was held at the Drizia-Miremont Tennis Club. Two-time Swiss champion Stanislas Wawrinka would later enter the world top 10 in the ATP rankings in 2008.

The Association of Tennis Professionals (ATP) awarded the Jim McManus Challenger Award to the tournament in 2013. This award honors the best challenger tournament in the world.

Past finals

Singles

Doubles

References

External links 
Official website
Drizia-Miremont Tennis Club
ITF Search 
ATP Vault

 
ATP Challenger Tour